The New Zealand Under 20's Rugby Team are the representative Rugby Union team from New Zealand. They replace the two former age grade teams Under 19s and Under 21s. Their first tournament was the 2008 IRB Junior World Championship, which they won after defeating England 38–3 in the final. They have gone on to also win the 2009, 2010, 2011, 2015 and 2017 World Rugby Under 20's Championship. The team also competes in the Oceania U20 Championship as of 2015. The New Zealand under 20s have been nicknamed the "Baby Blacks" after the youthful All Blacks side which played in 1986.

Overall
Summary for all matches played by the New Zealand Under-20's up until 11 July 2022

Results

2022

2022 Oceania Championship – (1st place)

2021
On 17 July they beat the Cook Islands national rugby union team by a score of 73-0.

2020
No competition.

2019

2019 World Championship – (7th place)

2019 Oceania Championship – (2nd place)

2018

2018 World Championship  – (4th place)

2018 Oceania Championship – (1st place)

2017

2017 World Championship  – (1st place)

2017 Oceania Championship – (1st place)

2016

2016 World Championship  – (5th place)

2016 Oceania Championship – (1st place)

2015

2015 World Championship – (1st place)

2015 Oceania Championship – (1st place)

2008 to 2014

2014 World Championship – (3rd place)

2013 World Championship – (4th place)

2012 World Championship – (2nd place)

The team's first-ever loss was 6–9 to Wales in 2012.

2011 World Championship – (1st place)

2010 World Championship – (1st place)

2009 World Championship – (1st place)

2008 World Championship – (1st place)

Squads

Current squad

The following players were named in the New Zealand Under-20 squad for the Oceania Rugby Under 20 Championship 2022.

Coaches
Due to the U20 category only existing since the combining of the U19 and U21 age-groups in 2007, the following table only includes coaches appointed since. In the inaugural tournament in 2008, Dave Rennie and Russell Hilton-Jones served as Co-Coaches in charge of the team. Craig Philpott is the longest serving Coach.

For the 2022 season Tom Donnelly is the Head Coach with Cory Jane and Scott Hansen as assistants.

See also

 New Zealand national schoolboy rugby union team
 New Zealand national under-19 rugby union team
 New Zealand national under-21 rugby union team
 Junior All Blacks

References

External links
 

Under20
Oceanian national under-20 rugby union teams